Sabira Begum better known as Asha Posley (Punjabi) (1927 – 25 March 1998) was the first heroine of Pakistani films.

Early life 
Asha Posley was born as Sabira Begum in Patiala, Punjab, British India in 1927.

Asha Posley was the daughter of music composer Inayat Ali Nath, who worked with HMV in Delhi, and the sister of renowned film playback singer Kausar Parveen and another sister Rani Kiran.

Career 
She made her debut as a supporting actress in Lahore-made Punjabi film Gawandi (1942), then the lead role in Hindi film Champa (1945), filmed in British India. She was given her professional name Asha Posley by the renowned music director Ghulam Haider. After the independence of Pakistan in 1947, she migrated with her family to the newly created Pakistan.

She was the heroine of the first-ever released film in Pakistan in Urdu language, Teri Yaad (1948). She played the female lead opposite Nasir Khan, famous Indian actor Dilip Kumar's brother, who played the male lead in the film. After playing the female lead role in just a few films, she was cast mainly in supporting roles especially opposite comedian actors Nazar and Asif Jah in most of her films. She acted in 129 films during her film career spanning over 3 decades.

Personal life 
Asha's younger sister Najma Begum was a television and film actress and her younger sister Kausar Parveen was married to music director Akhter Hussain Ankhiyan.

Death 
Asha Posley died on 26 March 1998 at Lahore, Pakistan at age 70.

Filmography

Television series

Film

Awards and recognition

See also 
 List of Pakistani actresses

References

External links
 

1927 births
Pakistani film actresses
20th-century Pakistani actresses
Nigar Award winners
20th-century Indian actresses
Actresses in Hindi cinema
People from Patiala
20th-century Pakistani women singers
Actresses in Urdu cinema
20th-century Indian singers
Pakistani radio personalities
20th-century Indian women singers
1998 deaths
People from Punjab, India
Actresses in Punjabi cinema
Indian film actresses
Pakistani women singers
Urdu-language singers
Radio personalities from Lahore
Pakistani ghazal singers
Pakistani classical singers
Indian musical theatre actresses
Punjabi people
Pakistani stage actresses
Punjabi-language singers
Pakistani playback singers
Women ghazal singers
Hindi-language singers
Singers from Lahore